Pop, commonly referred to as Pop TV (formerly known as Electronic Program Guide, Prevue Guide, Prevue Channel, TV Guide Channel, and TV Guide Network), is an American pay television channel owned by Paramount Global under its networks division through MTV Entertainment Group. It is a general entertainment channel, focusing primarily on programs pertaining to popular culture.

The network was originally launched in 1981 as a barker channel service providing a display of localized channel and program listings for cable television providers. Later on, the service, branded Prevue Channel or Prevue Guide and later as Prevue, began to broadcast interstitial segments alongside the on-screen guide, which included entertainment, news, and promotions for upcoming programs. After Prevue's parent company, United Video Satellite Group, acquired the entertainment magazine TV Guide in 1998 (UVSG would in turn, be acquired by Gemstar the following year), the service was relaunched as TV Guide Channel (later TV Guide Network), which now featured full-length programs dealing with the entertainment industry, including news magazines and reality shows, along with red carpet coverage from major award shows.

Following the acquisition of TV Guide Network by Lionsgate in 2009, its programming began to shift towards a general entertainment format with reruns of dramas and sitcoms. In 2013, CBS Corporation acquired of a 50% stake in the network, and the network was renamed TVGN. At the same time, as its original purpose grew obsolete because of the integrated program guides offered by digital television platforms, the network began to downplay and phase out its program listings service; as of June 2014, none of the network's carriage contracts require the display of the listings, and they were excluded entirely from its high-definition simulcast. In 2015, the network was rebranded as Pop. In 2019, CBS acquired Lionsgate's 50% stake in the network and merged with Viacom.

Pop is available to 67.348 million households in America as of September 2018.

History 

On September 18, 2014, CBS and Lionsgate announced that TVGN (previously TV Guide Network) would be relaunched as Pop in early 2015, with the rebranding later announced to occur on January 14 of that year. The newly branded channel would shift toward programming about pop culture fandom and would carry 400 hours of original programming following the rebrand, including a reality show starring New Kids on the Block and the Canadian sitcom Schitt's Creek, the first program from Pop TV to receive Primetime Emmy Award nominations, including Outstanding Comedy Series. Pop was made available on AT&T U-verse on March 1, 2016.

On March 12, 2019, CBS acquired Lionsgate's 50% stake in Pop, making Pop a part of CBS Cable Networks. It then became part of ViacomCBS Domestic Media Networks on December 4, 2019, when CBS merged with Viacom. Now under the latter's management, it was merged into Viacom's existing cable unit with corresponding job losses due to redundancies. As Viacom traditionally has their programming produced internally for their cable networks rather than from outside producers, second-season renewals for Flack and Florida Girls, along with a series order for Best Intentions were revoked, with Viacom freeing all three series to be shopped to other venues without penalty.

Programming 

Current programming seen on Pop includes a mix of original scripted and reality series, acquired and internationally co-produced series, and older series from various studios. Previously, the network also aired professional wrestling from Impact Wrestling and the Las Vegas-based Paragon Pro Wrestling.

References

External links 
 

Television networks in the United States
Paramount Media Networks
Former Lionsgate subsidiaries
Television channels and stations established in 1981
English-language television stations in the United States